Escapade is a 1955 British comedy drama film directed by Philip Leacock and starring John Mills, Yvonne Mitchell and Alastair Sim. It was based on a long-running West End play of the same name by Roger MacDougall.

The film was produced at the Nettlefold Studios in Walton-on-Thames in Surrey. The film's sets were designed by the art director Bernard Robinson.

Plot summary
A husband and father has become so preoccupied with a political cause that it leads him to neglect his familial responsibilities, leading to his children running away from home.

Cast
 John Mills as John Hampden
 Yvonne Mitchell as Mrs. Stella Hampden
 Alastair Sim as Dr. Skillingworth
 Jeremy Spenser as L. W. Daventry
 Andrew Ray as Max Hampden
 Marie Lohr as Stella Hampden, Senior
 Colin Gordon as Deeson, Reporter
 Nick Edmett as Paton 
 Peter Asher as Johnny Hampden
 Christopher Ridley as Potter
 Sean Barrett as Warren
 Colin Freear as Richard 'Young Skilly' Skillingworth
 Kit Terrington as Smith
 Mark Dignam as Sykes
 James Drake as Kirkland
 Sonia Williams as Miss Betts
 John Rae as Curly

Critical reception
In The New York Times, Bosley Crowther panned the film, writing, "It is a curiously notional and impractical expostulation against war, obviously well-intended but as humorless as a labored gag". Leonard Maltin, on the other hand, gave it three out of four stars, calling it an "Ambitious, insightful, solidly acted drama about the cynicism and hypocrisy of adults and the idealism of youth." TV Guide gave the film two out of four stars, calling it, "...an okay comedy with a message, but the play was better."

References

Bibliography
 Shaw, Tony. British Cinema and the Cold War: The State, Propaganda and Consensus. I.B. Tauris & Co, 2001.

External links
 
 
 

1955 films
1955 comedy-drama films
Films directed by Philip Leacock
British comedy-drama films
1955 drama films
Films set in London
British films based on plays
British black-and-white films
1950s English-language films
1950s British films